Robert Poirier (born 16 June 1942) is a French hurdler. He competed in the 400 metres hurdles at the 1964 Summer Olympics and the 1968 Summer Olympics.

References

External links
 

1942 births
Living people
Athletes (track and field) at the 1964 Summer Olympics
Athletes (track and field) at the 1968 Summer Olympics
French male hurdlers
Olympic athletes of France
Place of birth missing (living people)
Mediterranean Games bronze medalists for France
Mediterranean Games medalists in athletics
Athletes (track and field) at the 1963 Mediterranean Games
Universiade silver medalists for France
Universiade medalists in athletics (track and field)
Medalists at the 1965 Summer Universiade
20th-century French people
21st-century French people